Karai Tala is a village in Chandarkandi Union of Raipura Upazila, Narsingdi District, Bangladesh. According to the 2011 Bangladesh census, it had a population of 2,470. There is a primary school. There are three mosques and one temple (Kalimondir under a big banyan tree). There are two major Eidgah fields for two mosque-based mahallas. The second Eidgah was established in 2011 by praying Eid Ul Fitr, which is situated in the northern area of this village (near Mayl Basa rail gate). Mayl Basa is a well known public place where people meet daily.

References 

Populated places in Narsingdi District